Baseball was introduced in the Philippines during the American colonial period. Baseball was a national pastime in the country. The sport has become a re-emerging sport in the recent years. National policy and programs on baseball are, since 2018, directed by a renewed organization recognized by the Philippine Sports Commission and the Philippine Olympic Committee—the Philippine Amateur Baseball Association (PABA), reestablished the same year.

Early history

Baseball was introduced in the Philippines by the Americans. The first baseball game in the Philippines was played in September 1898 weeks after the Battle of Manila, a match between Astor Battery led by George Wetlaufer and a regiment from the American Army. From 1899 to 1900, baseball clubs were established by local Filipinos. The sport's introduction aided the American colonial government's assimilation efforts. General Otis planned to eliminate local cockfighting through the introduction of the sport. A baseball league composing of six clubs was established. Then, Governor General William Howard Taft encouraged baseball in the archipelago. Baseball grew to be a popular sport in the country.

Arlie Pond was instrumental to the growth of baseball in the country.

Baseball's popularity saw a decline from 1898 to 1923 because of claims of neglect by the Department of Public Instruction. Prior to 1998, sporting officials claimed that the department, through the Bureau of Education, had supported baseball in the country with the goal of eliminating cockfighting in the country. Teachers who were brought from the United States to the country had no experience in baseball and even in basic athletics. The Philippine Amateur Athletic Federation favored indoor baseball over its outdoor counterpart. In 1923, the Manila League was the only flourishing league in the country.

Late 20th century
Baseball experienced a boost when the Philippines hosted the first Asian Baseball Championship in 1954 and emerged as champions in the inaugural tournament. Bobby Balcena became the first player of Filipino descent to play in the Major League Baseball in 1956. Baseball continued to be a popular sport up to the mid 1970s. Political conflict among baseball officials led to the decline of the sports in the country. Basketball eventually gained popularity over baseball.

From 1971 to 1994, the Philippines did not take part in any international competition. Baseball suffered from lack of financial support and a decrease of baseball venues. There was also a lack of coverage on television on the sport.

21st century

Since 2005, the Philippine baseball became a re-emerging sport finishing just behind the three Asian baseball powerhouses. The Philippines became a powerhouse in the ASEAN region and has developed rivalries with Thailand and Indonesia. As part of a growing national revival, the professional Baseball Philippines league was established in 2007, but lasted for 5 years. The league was in 2019 replaced with a brand new league, the Philippine Baseball League (PBL), with a mix of school and corporate teams. In recent years the country's youth baseball contingents have played in the Little League Baseball regional and international qualifiers as well as in other competitions abroad, and have brought not just national prestige, but also increased interest in the sport among Filipinos, reinforced in the mid-2010s with the broadcasts of the Japanese anime series Major and Ace of Diamond on digital TV channel Yey!, which also doubled up its popularity among the young that now almost every city in the country has a baseball presence, as well as a rising number of public and private elementary and high schools have a youth baseball team, with amateur baseball teams now in the upswing in almost every corner of the country.

To reach out to Filipinos abroad, Canadian TV channel OMNI Television began airing Filipino language broadcasts of Toronto Blue Jays games on CJMT-DT beginning August 2018 for Toronto's Filipino community. This is the very first time that baseball has been aired on television in the Filipino language to serve Filipino baseball fans in Canada, there are currently no Filipino-language radio and television broadcasts of the other 29 MLB teams in the United States as of present, nor even Filipino-language broadcasts aired in television channels in the Philippines. However, MLB games do air in the country via cable and satellite.  

Unknown to Filipinos at home but known among the Filipino-American baseball fans in the US itself is that fact that there are already players in active playing duties in the MLB whose parents are of Filipino origin (for example, Addison Russell (currently of the Chicago Cubs) and Tim Lincecum (as of present a free agent and formerly of the Texas Rangers)). As of November 2018, an alumnus of the Philippine Little League baseball teams, Farhan Zaidi, is the current president of baseball operations for the San Francisco Giants, having grew up in the Philippines and began to play the game when he was a kid.

With ex-NFL quarterback Tim Tebow's transition into baseball and since he is as of 2019 now playing for the New York Mets AAA affiliate Syracuse Mets, if called into the Mets team in the currently ongoing 2019 season he will be the first Filipino-born player in many years to join the ranks of the major league teams.

See also
Philippines national baseball team
Baseball Philippines
List of baseball stadiums in the Philippines

References